Daniel Pratt Mannix IV (October 27, 1911 – January 29, 1997) was an American writer, journalist, photographer, sideshow performer, stage magician, animal trainer, and filmmaker. His best-known works are the 1958 book Those About to Die, which remained in continuous print for three decades and became the basis for the Ridley Scott movie Gladiator; and the 1967 novel The Fox and the Hound which in 1981 was adapted into an animated film by Walt Disney Productions.

Childhood
The Mannix family had a long history of service in the United States Navy, and Mannix' father, Daniel P. Mannix, III, was an American naval officer. His mother would often join her husband on his postings, and the Mannix children would stay at their grandparents' farm outside Philadelphia. It was there that Mannix began to keep and raise various wild animals. In time, the cost of feeding them led him to write his first book, The Back-Yard Zoo.  Following family tradition, Mannix enrolled in the U.S. Naval Academy in 1930, but left the next year, moving to the University of Pennsylvania and earning a degree in journalism instead of zoology.

Career
Mannix served as a naval lieutenant with the Photo-Science Laboratory in Washington, D.C. during World War II. His varied career included time spent as a sword swallower and fire eater in a traveling carnival sideshow, where he performed under the stage name The Great Zadma. His magazine articles about these experiences, co-written with his wife Jule Junker Mannix, proved very popular and were reprinted several times in 1944 and 1945, and later expanded into book form in his 1951 account of carnival life Step Right Up, which in turn was reprinted in 1964 as Memoirs of a Sword Swallower. He was also at times a professional hunter, a collector of wildlife for zoos and circuses, and a bird trainer. The latter skill was showcased in the 1956 short film Universal Color Parade: Parrot Jungle, in which he is credited as the writer, actor, director, producer, photographer, and bird trainer.

Mannix covered a wide variety of subject matter as an author. His books ranged from fictional stories for children, novels for adults featuring animal characters with accurate biology and psychology, the natural history of animals, and adventurous accounts about hunting big game to sensational adult non-fiction topics such as a biography of the occultist Aleister Crowley, sympathetic accounts of carnival performers and sideshow freaks, and works describing, among other things, the Hellfire Club, the Atlantic slave trade, the history of torture, and the Roman games. In 1983, he edited The Old Navy: The Glorious Heritage of the U.S. Navy, Recounted through the Journals of an American Patriot by Rear Admiral Daniel P. Mannix, 3rd, his father's posthumously-published autobiographical account of his life and naval career from the Spanish–American War of 1898 until his retirement in 1928.

In his role as a photo-journalist, Mannix witnessed the death of the famed herpetologist Grace Olive Wiley when she was fatally bitten by a venomous snake. On July 20, 1948, Wiley, then 64 years old, invited Mannix to her home in Cypress, California, to photograph her collection of snakes. She posed for him with a venomous Indian cobra she had recently acquired, at Mannix's suggestion, and the snake bit her on the finger when it was spooked by his camera flash. At her instruction, Mannix put tourniquets on her arm, but unfortunately, in trying to administer her only vial of cobra antivenom he found the needle was rusty, and he accidentally broke the vial. At her request, he took her to Long Beach Municipal Hospital, but the hospital only had antivenom serums for North American snakes. Wiley was placed in an iron lung to assist her breathing, but to no avail; she was pronounced dead less than two hours after being bitten. Fifteen years later, Mannix wrote an account of the event in his book All Creatures Great and Small, in which he titled Wiley the "Woman Without Fear."

Mannix was also a skilled stage magician, magic historian, and collector of illusions and apparatus. In 1957, he was one of the 16 charter members who co-founded the Munchkin Convention of the International Wizard of Oz Club. He prepared a manuscript encyclopedia of Oz and contributed numerous articles to The Baum Bugle, including on the subject of the 1902 musical extravaganza The Wizard of Oz.

Personal life
Mannix and his wife and sometime co-author Jule Junker Mannix travelled around the world and raised exotic animals. Jule Mannix wrote the book Married to Adventure in 1954 as an autobiographical account of her adventurous life with Mannix. The couple had a son, Daniel Pratt Mannix V, and a daughter, Julie Mannix von Zerneck (who married Frank von Zerneck). From 1950 onward, Daniel and Jule Mannix lived in the same house in East Whiteland, near Malvern, Pennsylvania. Jule Mannix died May 25, 1977. Mannix died on January 29, 1997, at the age of 85, and was survived by his son and daughter, four grandchildren (including Danielle von Zerneck), and four great-grandchildren.

Literary influence
According to Martin M Winkler's book, Gladiator: Film and History, Mannix's 1958 non-fiction book Those About to Die (reprinted in 2001 as The Way of the Gladiator) was the inspiration for David Franzoni's screenplay for the 2000 movie Gladiator.

Bibliography
 The Back-Yard Zoo, Coward-McCann, 1934
 More Back-Yard Zoo, 1936
 ; reprinted as Memoirs of a Sword Swallower, Ballantine, 1964; reprinted again in 1992 by Brainiac Books as Memoirs of a Sword Swallower with a new introduction by Herschell Gordon Lewis
 Hunter, Hamish Hamilton, 1952
 King of the Sky, 1953
 Tales of the African Frontier (with J.A. Hunter), Harper & Bros., 1954
 The Wildest Game (with Peter Ryhiner), J.B. Lippincott, 1958
 Those About to Die, Ballantine, 1958; reprinted as The Way of the Gladiator, 2001
 The Hellfire Club, Ballantine, 1959
 The Beast: The Scandalous Life of Aleister Crowley, Ballantine, 1959
 Black Cargoes: A History of the Atlantic Slave Trade 1518–1865 (with Malcolm Cowley), Viking Press, 1962
 The Autobiography of Daniel Mannix: All Creatures Great and Small, McGraw-Hill, 1963
 The History of Torture, Dell, 1964 (paperback); Hippocrene Books, 1986
 The Outcasts, 1965
 A Sporting Chance: Unusual Methods of Hunting, E.P. Dutton, 1967
 The Last Eagle, 1967
 The Fox and the Hound, E.P. Dutton, 1967
 The Killers, E.P. Dutton, 1968
 Troubled Waters: The Story of a Fish, a Stream and a Pond (with Patricia Collins), E.P. Dutton, 1969
 The Healer, E.P. Dutton, 1971
 Drifter, E.P. Dutton, 1974
 The Secret of the Elms, Crowell, 1975
 Freaks: We Who Are Not As Others, Re/Search Publications, 1976
 The Wolves of Paris, (hardcover) 1978; Avon (paperback), 1979, 1983
 The Old Navy: The Glorious Heritage of the U.S. Navy, Recounted through the Journals of an American Patriot by Rear Admiral Daniel P. Mannix, 3rd, as edited by Daniel P. Mannix 4th, Macmillan, 1983
 A Running Brook of Horror, A Dark and Stormy Night

Filmography
 King of the Sky, 1953 (documentary short) (writer, actor, director, producer, bird trainer)
 Universal Color Parade: Parrot Jungle, 1958 (short) (writer, director, producer, photographer, bird trainer)
 Killers of Kilimanjaro, 1959 (book African Bush Adventures)
 The Fox and the Hound, 1981 (book)

References

External links
 
 

1911 births
1997 deaths
20th-century American non-fiction writers
20th-century American male writers
American male non-fiction writers
Writers from Pennsylvania